Young and In Love is the 1979 debut album by American singer Stacy Lattisaw. Released on June 13, 1979 by Cotillion Records (a subsidiary of Atlantic Records), Lattisaw was 12 years old at the time of this release. The lead single peaked at number 91 on the U.S. Soul charts. The album was produced by Van McCoy, one of his final projects before his death from a heart attack.  Also, the title track is a cover of the hit 1964 song by Ruby & the Romantics.

Track listing
All tracks composed and arranged by Van McCoy; except where indicated
 "When You're Young and in Love" (Ballad Version) – 4:24
 "Love Is Here Beside Us" (Charles Kipps) – 4:26
 "Rock with Me" – 5:57 
 "Three Wishes" – 2:47
 "Spinning Top" (Melvin Steals, Mervin Steals, Robert Ledbetter) – 3:41
 "Dedicated to the One I Love" (Lowman Pauling, Ralph Bass) – 3:22
 "Downtown" (Tony Hatch) – 3:36
 "When You're Young and in Love" (Disco Version) – 3:30

Personnel
Stacy Lattisaw – vocals
Bert Jones, Hiram Bullock – guitar
Gordon Edwards – bass
Van McCoy – keyboards
Steve Jordan – drums
Doug Allen, George Devens – percussion
Albert Bailey, Brenda Hilliard, Diane Destry, Esther Marrow, J.J. Jackson, Richard Harris, Van McCoy, Zulema Cusseaux – backing vocals
Gene Orloff – conductor

Charts

Singles

References

External links
 Stacy Lattisaw-Young And In Love at Discogs

1979 debut albums
Stacy Lattisaw albums
Atlantic Records albums